The Tiki Adult Theater, at one time signed as the Tiki Theater Xymposium, is an adult theater in Los Angeles, California, located on Santa Monica Boulevard. As of 2021, it was the last remaining adult theater in Los Angeles. It was formerly part of the Pussycat Theater chain of pornographic movie theaters. , it was open 24 hours a day, with a ticket buying 4 hours admission.

References 

Adult movie theaters
Cinemas and movie theaters in Los Angeles